General Collins may refer to:

Arthur S. Collins Jr. (1915–1984), U.S. Army lieutenant general
Charles Collins (British Army officer) (fl. 1990s–2020s), British Army major general
Harry J. Collins (1895–1963), U.S. Army major general
J. Lawton Collins (1896–1987), U.S. Army general
James Francis Collins (1905–1989), U.S. Army general
James Lawton Collins (1882–1963), U.S. Army major general
James Lawton Collins Jr. (1917–2002), U.S. Army brigadier general
John A. Collins (chaplain) (1931–2003), U.S. Air Force major general
Michael Collins (astronaut) (1930–2021), U.S. Air Force major general
Michael Collins (Irish leader) (1890–1922), Irish National Army general
Robert Collins (British Army officer) (1880–1950), British Army major general
William R. Collins (1913–1991), U.S. Marine Corps major general

See also
Geoffrey Collin (1921–2009), British Army major general
Jean Christophe Collin (1754–1806), First French Empire general of cavalry
Charles H. T. Collis (1838–1902), Union Army brevet brigadier general